is a JR East railway station located in the city of Kitaakita, Akita Prefecture, Japan.

Lines
Nukazawa Station is served by the Ōu Main Line, and is located 388.1 km from the terminus of the line at Fukushima Station.

Station layout
The station consists of a two opposed side platforms serving two tracks, connected to the station building by a footbridge. The station is unattended.

Platforms

History
Nukazawa Station was opened on December 3, 1956 on the Japan National Railways (JNR) serving the town of Takanosu, Akita. The station was absorbed into the JR East network upon the privatization of the JNR on April 1, 1987.

Surrounding area
 
Nukazawa Jinja

External links

 JR East Station information 

Railway stations in Japan opened in 1956
Railway stations in Akita Prefecture
Ōu Main Line
Kitaakita